Cuban Vodú is a religion indigenous to Cuba. It is a religion formed from the blending of Fon and Ewe beliefs and Dahomey religion which came to form Haitian Vodou. Loa are worshiped by the religion's practitioners. Cuban Vodú is noteworthy for its popularity in the Oriente Province of Cuba and a lack of academic study of the religion.

Even though much of the practices come from Haitian immigrants bringing Haitian Vodou to Cuba the Cuban practices subsequently evolved and came to differ in some ways. For instance: feats of strength are more common in ceremonies and dance movements differ. Cuban Vodú is composed of three divisions: the Indigenous American Division, whose spirits are of American origin (usually refers to Taíno spirits); the African Division, whose spirits are of African origin (usually Fon and Ewe spirits); and the European Division, whose spirits are of European origin (usually Spanish spirits).

See also
 Candomblé Jejé
 Dominican Vudu
 Louisiana Voodoo

References

External links
El Vodú francohaitiano en la cultura cubana

Afro-American religion
Afro-Cuban culture
Voodoo